Canterò is the second album by French singer Amaury Vassili. It was released on 26 November 2010. It was followed up by a new edition in 2011 containing his 2011 Eurovision Song Contest hit single "Sognu".

Track listing

Chart performance

Release history

References

2010 albums
Amaury Vassili albums
Warner Music France albums